The 2018–19 season was 19th season in the top Ukrainian football league for Zorya Luhansk. Zorya competed in Premier League, Ukrainian Cup and UEFA Europa League.

Players

Squad information

Transfers

In

Out

Pre-season and friendlies

Competitions

Overall

Premier League

League table

Results summary

Results by round

Matches

Ukrainian Cup

UEFA Europa League

Statistics

Appearances and goals

|-
! colspan=16 style=background:#dcdcdc; text-align:center| Goalkeepers

|-
! colspan=16 style=background:#dcdcdc; text-align:center| Defenders

|-
! colspan=16 style=background:#dcdcdc; text-align:center| Midfielders 

|-
! colspan=16 style=background:#dcdcdc; text-align:center| Forwards

|-
! colspan=16 style=background:#dcdcdc; text-align:center| Players transferred out during the season

 
Last updated: 19 July 2020

Goalscorers

Last updated: 19 July 2020

Clean sheets

Last updated: 19 July 2020

Disciplinary record

Last updated: 19 July 2020

Attendances

Last updated: 19 July 2020

References

External links
Official website

Zorya Luhansk
FC Zorya Luhansk seasons
Zorya Luhansk